The Sukhothai Institute of Physical Education Stadium or Sukhothai Province Stadium is a multi-purpose stadium in Sukhothai Province, Thailand, built to host the Sukhothai F.C. in Thailand Division 2 League from 2009 to 2013. The stadium is made up of a main stand with a capacity of 2,500 and second stand on the opposite side of the field with a capacity  of 2,000. Only the main stand has seats and is covered, the second stand is uncovered and is made of concrete steps. The stadium is also fitted with an electronic scoreboard and is also used by the local public for various events.

Main stand
The main stand has a maximum capacity of 2,500 (All seated) and also contains most facilities including changing rooms, meeting rooms and a media room.

References

Multi-purpose stadiums in Thailand
Buildings and structures in Sukhothai province
Sport in Sukhothai province
Football venues in Thailand
Sports venues completed in 2009
2009 establishments in Thailand